Kikos (Կիկոս) is a 1979 Armenian animation film by Robert Sahakyants based on the story by Hovhannes Tumanyan.

Plot
A heartbroken family mourns the death of Kikos' son, nephew and grandson. The irony of the situation is that Kikos is not born yet.

References

External links

1979 films